Pete Cordelli Jr. (born September 14, 1953) is a former American football coach and scout. He served as the head football coach at Kent State University from 1991 to 1993, compiling a record of 3–30. Cordelli served as an assistant coach under Lou Holtz at the University of Arkansas, the University of Minnesota, and the University of Notre Dame. He was a member of the staff on Holtz's 1988 Notre Dame team, which won a national championship. Cordelli was considered for the head football coaching position at the University of Toledo in December 1989. The job went to Nick Saban.

Cordelli began calling Arkansas State Red Wolves football broadcasts with Roger Twibell on ESPN+ in 2018.

Head coaching record

College

References

1953 births
Living people
Arkansas Razorbacks football coaches
Arkansas State Red Wolves football announcers
Cleveland Browns scouts
Dallas Cowboys scouts
Kent State Golden Flashes football coaches
Memphis Tigers football coaches
Minnesota Golden Gophers football coaches
Notre Dame Fighting Irish football coaches
Rhodes Lynx football coaches
TCU Horned Frogs football coaches
Western Michigan Broncos football coaches
North Carolina State University alumni
People from Langhorne, Pennsylvania